Frankclay is an unincorporated community and census-designated places in West Central St. Francois County, Missouri, United States. It is located approximately one mile south of Route 8 about five miles west of Flat River.

A post office called Frankclay was established in 1905, and remained in operation until 1973. The community has the name of the original owner of the town site.

Demographics

References

Census-designated places in St. Francois County, Missouri
Census-designated places in Missouri
Unincorporated communities in St. Francois County, Missouri
Unincorporated communities in Missouri